Thelma is a 1922 American silent drama film directed by Chester Bennett and starring Jane Novak, Barbara Tennant and Gordon Mullen. It is based on the 1887 novel of the same title by the British writer Marie Corelli.

A Norwegian woman falls in love with an Englishman and moves to London to live with him. However his jealous friends plot to drive them apart.

Thelma as a child was played by Jane Novak's four-year-old daughter Virginia.

Cast

 Jane Novak as Thelma Guildmar
 Barbara Tennant as Britta
 Gordon Mullen as Lovissa
 Bert Sprotte as Olaf Guildmar
 Vernon Steele as Sir Phillip Errington 
 Peter Burke as Lorimer
 Jack Rollens as Sigurd
 Harvey Clark as Dyceworthy
 June Elvidge as Lady Clara Winsleigh
 Wedgwood Nowell as Lennox
 Virginia Novak as Little Thelma
 Harry Lonsdale as Neville

References

Bibliography
 Munden, Kenneth White. The American Film Institute Catalog of Motion Pictures Produced in the United States, Part 1. University of California Press, 1997.

External links
 

1922 films
1922 drama films
1920s English-language films
American silent feature films
Silent American drama films
American black-and-white films
Films directed by Chester Bennett
Film Booking Offices of America films
Films based on British novels
Films set in Norway
Films set in London
1920s American films
English-language drama films